Tolé District is a district (distrito) of Chiriquí Province in Panama. The population according to the 2000 census was 11,563. The district covers a total area of 488 km2. The capital lies at the city of Tolé.

Administrative divisions
Tolé District is divided administratively into the following corregimientos:

Tolé (capital)
Cerro Viejo
Lajas de Tolé
Potrero de Caña
Quebrada de Piedra
Bella Vista
El Cristo
Justo Fidel Palacios
Veladero

References

Districts of Panama
Chiriquí Province